Jeremy Hotz (born May 31, 1965) is a Canadian–American actor and stand-up comedian. Hotz won a Gemini Award for his role on the television series The Newsroom in 1997. He has appeared on Comedy Central Presents, the Just For Laughs comedy festival, the Late Show with David Letterman, and The Tonight Show with Jay Leno. He has also worked as a staff writer for Paramount's The Jon Stewart Show  and has appeared in various American and Canadian motion pictures including: My Favorite Martian, Speed 2: Cruise Control, and Married Life.

Filmography

Films
Speed 2: Cruise Control (1997)
My Favorite Martian (1999)
Escape from the Newsroom (2002)
James the Second (2021)

Television
Married Life (1995)
The Newsroom (1996–2005)
Made in Canada (2003)

References

External links
Official Website

1963 births
Living people
Canadian stand-up comedians
Comedians from Toronto
Male actors from Toronto
People from Tarzana, Los Angeles
Male actors from Cape Town
Canadian male television actors
Jewish Canadian male actors
Jewish Canadian comedians
Canadian emigrants to the United States
20th-century Canadian comedians
21st-century Canadian comedians
Canadian Comedy Award winners